Ellalong 'The Jewel of the Mountain' is a small town located in the Hunter Region of New South Wales, Australia at the foot of the Watagan Mountains.

Neighboring towns include Pelton, Paxton, Congewai and Quorrobolong.

At the 2016 census, the Ellalong township had a population of 1098.

History
Ellalong Public School in the County of Northumberland was established in June 1863 and closed in December 1863. Ellalong Public School re-opened in 1868.
The Ellalong Hotel was built specifically in the mining boom in 1924.

Population
In the 2016 Census, there were 1,098 people in Ellalong. 83.3% of people were born in Australia and 90.9% of people spoke only English at home. The most common responses for religion were No Religion 30.7%, Anglican 28.8% and Catholic 15.4%. The median age was 39 years old . 535 were male and 560 were female.

Ellalong Lagoon (Catch-a-boy Swamp)
The village is home to a large Lagoon that is of Aboriginal cultural significance. The Ellalong Lagoon is a  mythical site known as Catch-a-boy Swamp, where a Bunyip is said to have lived and taken a young boy who was swimming or playing in the lagoon. Parents would use the story to reinforce the danger to their children of playing in the lagoon. Locals that grew up in the area were well aware of the myth, but would still swim in the Swamp in the Summer months, often trying to scare each other with stories of the Bunyip.
When full, the lagoon is a picturesque site but will at times completely dry up with drought. The Quorrobolong Creek section of the Swamp can be viewed from the front of the Ellalong Hotel also overlooking the Watagan Mountains.

1994 Earthquake
Ellalong was the epicentre of an earthquake recorded as magnitude 5.4 on the 06 Aug 1994. Five people in the Hunter region were injured and 1000 homes damaged in this earthquake. The quake was the biggest in the region since the Newcastle quake in 1989.

Notes

References

Suburbs of City of Cessnock
Towns in the Hunter Region